Hymenobacter glacieicola  is a Gram-negative, rod-shaped and non-motile bacterium from the genus of Hymenobacter which has been isolated from glacier ice from the Muztagh Glacier from the Tibetan Plateau in China.

References

External links
Type strain of Hymenobacter glacieicola at BacDive -  the Bacterial Diversity Metadatabase

glacieicola
Bacteria described in 2016